Bibiana can refer to:

Places
 Bibiana, Piedmont, Italian commune
 Santa Bibiana, church in Rome

Name
 Saint Bibiana, fourth-century Italian saint
 Bibiana Aído (b. 1977), Spanish politician
 Bibiana Beglau (b. 1971), German actress
 Bibiana Candelas (b. 1983), Mexican volleyball player
 Bibiana Fernández (b. 1954), Spanish actress
 Bibiana Ferrea (b. 1981), Argentine handball player
 Bibiana Ng (b. 1977), Malaysian shooter
 Bibiana Olama (b. 1982), Equatoguinean athlete
 Bibiana Perez (b. 1970), Italian skier
 Bibiana Rodríguez (b. 1969), Mexican politician
 Bibiana Steinhaus (b. 1979), German football referee

See also

 Vivian (given name)
 Viviana (disambiguation)
 Bibianna, Greater Poland Voivodeship, Polish village